Erev Hadash (lit. The New Evening) was one of the most veteran and successful Israeli TV news programs produced by Israeli Educational Television (also known as Hinuchit), specially commissioned for Channel 1 (later KAN 11). The show was first aired on June 7, 1982, the second day of the 1982 Lebanon War, as a show of soldiers sending regards to their family from the front, and news flash, and it was originally during this period named Operation Peace for Galilee (read as Mivtsa Shlom HaGalil), the identical name of the operation of the war.

The show aired every day at 4:59 pm, the first round of pre-primetime news shows (which incorporates a short news update from Channel 1 at 5:00pm), and its regular host was the veteran and well-known Israeli Journalist, Dan Margalit.

The program ended its broadcasts after 36 years of broadcasting, ahead of the closure of the IET. The last edition, which was hosted by Dan Margalit, was broadcast on August 5, 2018.

External links
 Erev Hadash, on Israeli Educational Television.

Israeli Educational Television
Israeli television news shows
Channel 1 (Israel) original programming
1982 Israeli television series debuts
1980s Israeli television series
1990s Israeli television series
2000s Israeli television series
2010s Israeli television series